Yuri Rubenovich Karamyan (born March 15, 1947) is a Russian professional football coach.

External links
Profile at Footballfacts.ru

1947 births
Living people
Soviet football managers
Russian football managers
FC Luch Vladivostok managers